In geometry, the great triakis icosahedron is a nonconvex isohedral polyhedron. It is the dual of the uniform great stellated truncated dodecahedron. Its faces are isosceles triangles. Part of each triangle lies within the solid, hence is invisible in solid models.

Proportions 
The dihedral angle equals .

See also
 Triakis icosahedron

References

External links 
 

Dual uniform polyhedra